"I've Been Loving You Too Long" (originally "I've Been Loving You Too Long (To Stop Now)") is a soul music ballad written by Otis Redding and Jerry Butler.  Considered by music critics and writers to be one of Redding's finest performances and a soul classic, it is a slow, emotional piece with Redding's pleading vocals backed by producer Steve Cropper's arpeggiated guitar parts and a horn section.

Redding recorded the song in 1965 and when released as a single in April 1965, became his second best selling single. The song was subsequently included on his third album, Otis Blue: Otis Redding Sings Soul (1965). The song reached number 21 on the Billboard Hot 100 and number 2 on the Billboard Rhythm & Blues chart.  Billboard described it as a "winning tender and soulful piece of material and performance by 'Mr. Pitiful' himself."  Cash Box described it as "a tender, slow-moving heartfelt lament about a fella whose love for his gal is growing cold."
The song was added to the United States National Recording Registry in 2003.

Background and composition
Songs by Redding appeared in the U.S. Billboard pop and R&B charts as early as 1962, but "I've Been Loving You Too Long" became his biggest hit upon its release.

Although the tempo is exactly the same, two versions of the song have been recorded in 1965; one lasts 2'50 and the second one is 3'10 long (in the original LP version), i.e., with an extra verse. Booker T. Jones plays piano on one version while Isaac Hayes is on the other.

Recording and personnel
Otis Redding – vocals
Booker T. Jones – keyboards, piano
Isaac Hayes – keyboards, piano
Steve Cropper – guitar
Donald Dunn – bass guitar
Al Jackson Jr. – drums
Wayne Jackson – trumpet
Gene Miller – trumpet
Andrew Love – tenor saxophone
Floyd Newman – baritone saxophone

Ike & Tina Turner version 

Ike & Tina Turner recorded the song for their 1969 album, Outta Season. Produced by Tina Turner and Bob Krasnow, the single peaked at number 23 on the Billboard R&B chart and number 68 on the Billboard Hot 100. It was reissued in 1971, reaching number 56 on the Cash Box R&B chart and number 44 on Record World's R&B chart.

Live performances 
The Turners can be seen performing the song at Madison Square Garden in the Rolling Stones concert film Gimme Shelter (1970). Their version differs from the original because they added an additional section with an explicit interaction. During their live performances they simulated oral sex. Tina caressed the microphone and moaned while Ike made suggestive slurping noises. Prior to Tina, a former member of the Kings of Rhythm named Jimmy Thomas would perform that song. In her autobiography I, Tina, she said: Then when Jimmy left, I started singing the song, because it was a very good show song, and I started mimicking Jimmy, but putting my own female thing into it. I was really involved with that song in the beginning. Then I became bored with it, but Ike wouldn't let me stop. He started making those noises in the background, and it became really pornographic. Embarrassing. But the people loved it.

Track listing

Johnny Diesel version

In 1992 Australian musician, Diesel recorded the song for his ARIA Chart number 1 album, The Lobbyist (1993). It was released as the third and final single and peaked at number 41 on the Australian ARIA Chart on 29 November 1993.

Track listing
 "I've Been Loving You Too Long"
 "Come to Me" (UK Remix)

Other versions
 The first cover of the song was a recording by the Rolling Stones in 1965, shortly after Redding's original version became a hit. It was included on the Stones' first live album, Got Live If You Want It! (1966), although the track was a studio recording that had been overdubbed with audience noises. Returning the compliment, Redding covered the Rolling Stones song "(I Can't Get No) Satisfaction", written by Mick Jagger and Keith Richards.

Chart performance

References

1965 songs
1965 singles
1969 singles
1994 singles
Otis Redding songs
Songs written by Otis Redding
Songs written by Jerry Butler
Song recordings produced by Don Gehman
Ike & Tina Turner songs
Blue Thumb Records singles
EMI Records singles
James & Bobby Purify songs
Barbara Mandrell songs
Diesel (musician) songs
Guy Sebastian songs
The Rolling Stones songs
United States National Recording Registry recordings
Etta James songs
Loleatta Holloway songs
Atco Records singles